Loxostege bicoloralis is a moth in the family Crambidae. It was described by Warren in 1892. It is found in Iraq.

References

Moths described in 1892
Pyraustinae